Clarence Albert Poindexter (May 4, 1905  – January 28, 1984), known as Al Dexter, was an American country musician and songwriter.  He is best known for "Pistol Packin' Mama," a 1943 hit that was one of the most popular recordings of the World War II years and later became a hit again with a cover by Bing Crosby and The Andrews Sisters.

Biography
Born in Jacksonville, Texas, United States, Dexter owned a bar in the 1930s and helped popularize the style of country music known as honky tonk. He made his recording debut on November 28, 1936, for ARC Records. and he was probably the first artist to use the term "honky tonk" in a country song when he recorded "Honky Tonk Blues" at his first session. His self-penned hit, "Pistol Packin' Mama", became the 1943 marching chorus of the New York Yankees. The 1943 movie of the same name, made by the Republic Pictures, gave Dexter close to $250,000 in royalties. Another hit from the 1940s was "Guitar Polka", which entered Billboard's list as the "Most Played Juke Box Folk Record" for 16 weeks running in 1946. Still other hits include "So Long Pal", "Triflin' Gal", "I'm Losing My Mind Over You" and "Too Late to Worry, Too Blue to Cry."

Dexter was the first country singer to perform on Broadway, and in 1971, was inducted into the Nashville Songwriters Hall of Fame. He died on January 28, 1984, in Lewisville, Texas.

On August 21, 2010, Dexter was inducted into the Texas Country Music Hall Of Fame, located in Carthage, Texas. Other inductees that night along with Dexter were George Jones and Ray Winkler.

Following Al Dexter's death in 1984, his family discovered 50 master tapes containing studio recordings. In 2010, Al Dexter's son, Carl Wayne Poindexter, released the three-disc CD box set entitled Al Dexter's Found Masters Volume 1–3 on his independent record label, Al Dexter Estate Productions. This professionally produced collection contained digitally re-mastered studio recordings which were made by Dexter with various band line-ups and configurations.

Discography

Albums

Singles

References

Bibliography
 Peter La Chapelle, Proud To Be An Okie, University of California Press, 2007
 Tony Russell, Country Music Originals: The Legends and the Lost, Oxford University Press, 2007
 Tony Russell, Bob Pinson, Country Music Records: A Discography 1921–1942, Oxford University Press, 2004

External links
Archived Al Dexter Website
obituary for Al Dexter's son Carl Wayne
obituary for Al Dexter's son-in-law Leon Dudley

1905 births
1984 deaths
American male singer-songwriters
American country singer-songwriters
People from Jacksonville, Texas
King Records artists
Vocalion Records artists
Ekko Records artists
Singer-songwriters from Texas
20th-century American singers
Country musicians from Texas
20th-century American male singers